is a Japanese fantasy manga series written by Kawo Tanuki and illustrated by Choco Aya. It was serialized in Mag Garden's shōnen manga magazine Monthly Comic Garden from December 2016 to December 2022 and has been collected in nine tankōbon volumes. The manga is licensed in North America by Seven Seas Entertainment. An anime television series adaptation by Signal.MD aired from April to June 2021.

Characters

A young red dragon, who despite his race's viciousness, happens to be weak and timid. After he gets kicked out by his family, he goes to search for his dream home where he can be safe. Due to circumstances beyond his control, he unintentionally becomes infamous as the Flame Dragon Lord.

A powerful elf magician who is also a skilled architect and knows the real estate business, as well as a number of other personages. Over a thousand years ago, he accidentally inherited the Demon Lord title by "winning" it at a lottery, making him the supreme figurehead of all non-humans. He takes in Letty as his client to different estates to find him his dream home, partly because of his previous experience with another dragon.

Full name: Piyovelt Phelpia Pi Alpine Piyoderika. It is a hræsvelgr, a species of giant arctic eagle. After Letty finds its egg by happenstance and it hatches, the chick imprints on Letty, who eventually adopts it as a foundling.

Full name: Andriana Ellen Croixdea Margarethe Emmalyn Narsham Felna. She is a spoiled and stubborn human princess who ran away from home after her father ate a cupcake she had craved. After recognizing Letty's pacifistic nature, she joins him and Diaria on their home-hunting quest.

A fighter and the leader of a quartet of "Heroes" who become Letty's comical nemeses by popping up wherever he wants to settle down, only to be killed or driven off and then return for yet another attempt. 

A member of Hero's adventuring party.

A member of Hero's adventuring party.

A member of Hero's adventuring party.

A human Hunter who stole the egg Letty was supposed to guard, leading to the dragon's banishment.

A Cait (anthropomorphic cat) and Huey's Hunter partner.

A former lord and the owner of a mansion on Diaria's list of available estates; in fact, in life he was an old friend of Diaria. Having become a wraith, he still haunts his family mansion with his undead retainers.

A petulant black dragon who, like Letty, long ago sought out Diaria for advice on a new home and became his first dragon travelling companion. He grandstandingly prefers to be referred to as the Mighty Black Dragon, a legendary harbinger of destruction.

Media

Manga
The series is written by Kawo Tanuki and illustrated by Choco Aya. It was serialized in Mag Garden's shōnen manga magazine Monthly Comic Garden from December 5, 2016 to December 5, 2022, and has been collected in nine tankōbon volumes. The manga is licensed in North America by Seven Seas Entertainment.

A spin-off manga will begin serialization in the same magazine in January 2023.

Anime
An anime adaptation was announced in the fifth volume of the manga on October 10, 2019, later revealed as a television series on May 9, 2020. It was animated by Signal.MD and directed by Haruki Kasugamori, with Shiori Asuka and Su Shiyi designing the characters, and Kyōhei Matsuno composing the music. The series aired from April 4 to June 20, 2021 on Tokyo MX, ytv, and BS Fuji. Masayoshi Ōishi performed the series' opening theme song "Role-playing", while Non Stop Rabbit performed the series' ending theme song "Shizuka na Kaze". Funimation licensed the series. Following Sony's acquisition of Crunchyroll, the series was moved to Crunchyroll.

Reception

Previews
Anime News Network (ANN) had three editors review the first episode of the anime: Richard Eisenbeis was critical of the "meta-commentary" referencing RPG video games that's either a fourth wall breaking gag or implies technology is being used in its fantasy setting but was intrigued by how the house-hunting content will sustain a whole season; Caitlin Moore was initially positive during the opening minutes but criticized Letty for being an insufferable character, the repetitive humor and the "extremely limited" animation for making it a "pretty boring" viewing experience. She concluded that: "At the very least, it's gentle and harmless, unlikely to upset or offend even the most sensitive viewers." The third reviewer, Rebecca Silverman, praised it for being a good series prologue that contains humorous scenarios and designs that transfer from its source material into animation very well, concluding that: "This series stands to be a lot of fun, the fantasy and real estate mashup you didn't know you needed. I'm definitely looking forward to seeing more."

Series reception
Fellow ANN editor Mercedez Clewis reviewed the complete anime series and gave it an overall B grade. While finding criticism in the inconsistent comedy (highlighting the overuse of video game references), generic soundtrack and peripheral human side characters, she gave it praise for having a "well-acted and solidly directed" English dub with Michael Kovach and Steven Kelly as standouts, the chemistry between Letty and Diaria, and being a suitable gateway anime for younger audiences, concluding that: "In the end, Dragon Goes House-Hunting is easily one of the most underrated anime from the Spring season." Stig Høgset, writing for THEM Anime Reviews, wrote that: "Dragon Goes House-Hunting turned out to be a fun little journey in the world of reasonably tough love and diverse housing. It understands comedy well enough not to repeat the same joke three times, and, like I said, it's got some wonderfully snappy dialogue to its name. It has a colorful, wonderful world for Letty to discover as he goes from house to house on his lovely journey of discovery and homemaking, and if a second season is ever greenlit, I will be there."

Notes

References

External links
 Dragon Goes House-Hunting at Monthly Comic Garden 
  
 

2021 anime television series debuts
Anime series based on manga
Crunchyroll anime
Fantasy anime and manga
Mag Garden manga
Norse mythology in anime and manga
Seven Seas Entertainment titles
Shōnen manga
Signal.MD
Tokyo MX original programming
Works about dragons